Pua novaezealandiae is a species of spiders in the family Anapidae. It is the only species in the genus Pua. It is found only in New Zealand.

References

Anapidae
Spiders of New Zealand
Spiders described in 1959